Alexander Wilson (July 6, 1766 – August 23, 1813) was a Scottish-American poet, ornithologist, naturalist, and illustrator. Identified by George Ord as the "Father of American Ornithology", Wilson is regarded as the greatest American ornithologist prior to Audubon.

Biography

Early life 
Wilson was born in Paisley, Scotland on July 6, 1766. He was apprenticed as a weaver in 1779.

Poetry and emigration 
While working as a weaver in Paisley, Wilson became seriously interested in poetry. He was inspired by the dialect verse of Robert Burns, who was only seven years older. He was close friends with fellow Paisley poet Ebenezer Picken.

In addition to ballads and pastoral pieces, Wilson wrote satirical commentary on the conditions of weavers in the mills. His authorship of a satirical poem with severe personal statements about a mill owner resulted in Wilson's arrest. His work was said to be inflammatory and libelous; he was often in trouble with the law. Because he devoted little time to his trade as a weaver, Wilson lived in poverty. In 1794, he decided to emigrate to America.

From teaching to ornithology 

Opportunities were scarce for weavers in the Philadelphia area, and Wilson turned to teaching.

Wilson taught at the Milestown School in Bristol Township, the present-day East Oak Lane neighborhood of Philadelphia, for five years from 1796 to 1801. He then moved on to teach briefly in New Jersey.

Eventually, Wilson settled into a position at Gray's Ferry, Pennsylvania, and took up residence in nearby Kingsessing. There, he met the famous naturalist William Bartram, who encouraged Wilson's interest in ornithology and painting.

Resolved to publish a collection of illustrations of all the birds of North America, Wilson traveled widely, collecting and painting. He also secured subscribers to fund his work, the nine-volume American Ornithology (1808–1814). Of the 268 species of birds illustrated in its pages, 26 had not previously been described. His illustrations of birds in poses were an inspiration for James Audubon and other illustrators and naturalists.   

In 1813, Wilson was elected a member of the American Philosophical Society.

Death 

Wilson died on August 23, 1813, "of dysentery, overwork, and chronic poverty" according to one report. He was buried in Philadelphia, in the cemetery at Gloria Dei (Old Swedes') church. The two final volumes of American Ornithology were completed by Wilson's friend and patron George Ord, who was an executor of Wilson's estate.

An image entitled "Swedish Lutheran Church", which depicts an apparently elderly individual mourning at the grave of Wilson, was drawn by Thomas Sully (1783–1872), engraved and printed in 1828 by Cephas G. Childs and B. Rogers, respectively, and published in a book of landscapes, Views of Philadelphia (1827–1830).

Legacy 
In Paisley, a statue of Wilson was erected on the grounds of Paisley Abbey. A memorial on the banks of River Cart, near the Hammills rapids and waterfall, commemorates Wilson's connection to that city. The memorial is inscribed "Remember Alexander Wilson 1766–1813. Here was his boyhood playground."

A genus of warblers, Wilsonia (now obsolete), was named for Wilson by Charles Lucien Bonaparte. Several species of bird were also named in honor of Wilson, including the Wilson's storm-petrel, Wilson's plover, Wilson's phalarope, Wilson's snipe, and Wilson's warbler.

According to an article about his life, Wilson's meeting with James Audubon "probably inspired Audubon to publish his own book on birds, and he also influenced many later artists and ornithologists".

The Wilson Journal of Ornithology and the Wilson Ornithological Society also bear his name.

Gallery

Published works
 Wilson, Alexander. n.d. The tears of Britain. A poem. OCLC: 166684875.
 Wilson, Alexander. 1808–1814. American Ornithology; or, the Natural History of the Birds of the United States: Illustrated with Plates Engraved and Colored from Original drawings taken from Nature.
 Wilson, Alexander. 1800. List of pieces written by Mr. Alexander Wilson, now in Philadelphia. [Paisley, Scotland]: Printed by Andrew Young. At head of title: Paisley repository. No. VIII. Probable decade of imprint from NSTC. "The American blue bird [by A. Wilson, in verse]": p. 2-3; "The Baltimore bird [by A. Wilson, part in verse]": p. 4.
 Wilson, Alexander. 1800. Watty and Meg: or the wife reclaimed, together with : Habbie Sampson and his wife or, a new way of raising the wind : Donald and his dog : the West Kintra weaver turned teetotaler : the Loss o' the pack : John Tamson's cart : Takin' it out o' his mouth. Paisley, Scotland: W. Wilson.
 Wilson, Alexander. 1800. Rab and Ringan: a tale as delivered in the Pantheon, Edinburgh by the author of Watty and Meg; to which is added The twa cats and the cheese, a tale. Glasgow: Brash & Reid.
 Wilson, Alexander. 1801. Oration, on the power and value of national liberty delivered to a large assembly of citizens, at Milestown, Pennsylvania, on Wednesday, March 4, 1801. Philadelphia: Printed by H. Maxwell. Reprinted in Early American imprints. Second series;, no. 1668.
 Wilson, Alexander. Papers, 1806–1813. Philadelphia: American Philosophical Society. This material relates to Alexander B. Grosart's biography of Wilson. There are notes and copies of letters and documents, including a copy of Wilson's will. There is one poem by Wilson, "The Last Wish," and an 1806 letter to William Bartram.
 Wilson, Alexander. 1814. The Foresters: A Poem, Descriptive of a Pedestrian Journey to the Falls of Niagara in the Autumn of 1804. Newtown (PA): S. Siegfried & J. Wilson. Also published in the magazine The Port Folio in 1809/1810.

See also
List of 18th-century British working-class writers

Notes

References

Further reading 
 
 
  
 
 
 
  Expanded from Ord's vol. 9 of American Ornithology.

External links

Collections
 Complete illustrations from the 9-volume edition of Alexander Wilson, American Ornithologist (at University of Virginia)
 Selected plates from Wilson's American Ornithology (at Linda Hall Library)
Alexander Wilson (exhibition at Cornell University)
Wilson's poetry – collection of Wilson's poetry (at Virginia Tech)

Other sources

 
 
 
 

1766 births
1813 deaths
18th-century American artists
18th-century American male artists
American naturalists
American ornithologists
Artists from Paisley, Renfrewshire
Kingdom of Scotland emigrants to the Thirteen Colonies
Scottish naturalists
Scottish ornithologists
Scottish political writers
Scottish schoolteachers
Poets from Paisley, Renfrewshire
American bird artists
Writers from Paisley, Renfrewshire
Burials at Gloria Dei (Old Swedes') Church